Marvin Kleihs (born 19 March 1994) is a German footballer who plays as a right-back or left-back for Regionalliga Nordost club BFC Dynamo.

References

External links
 
 
 

1994 births
Living people
People from Stendal
German footballers
Association football midfielders
VfL Wolfsburg II players
Würzburger Kickers players
SC Weiche Flensburg 08 players
Berliner AK 07 players
Berliner FC Dynamo players
Regionalliga players
3. Liga players
Footballers from Saxony-Anhalt